Micralestes stormsi is a species of fish in the family Alestidae. It is found in Burundi, the Democratic Republic of the Congo, Tanzania, and Zambia. Its natural habitat is rivers.

The fish is named in honor of Lieut. Maurice Joseph Auguste Marie Raphael Storms (1875-1941), of the Belgian Army, who collected the type specimen and presented it to the Brussels Museum. The describer, Boulenger said Storms is the cousin of Raymond Storms, who was “so well known for his important contributions to paleoichthyology”.

References

Micralestes
Taxa named by George Albert Boulenger
Fish described in 1902
Taxonomy articles created by Polbot